The Profile in Courage Award is a private award given to recognize displays of courage similar to those John F. Kennedy originally described in his book of the same name. It is given to individuals (often elected officials) who, by acting in accord with their conscience, risked their careers or lives by pursuing a larger vision of the national, state or local interest in opposition to popular opinion or pressure from constituents or other local interests.

The winners of the award are selected by a committee named by the John F. Kennedy Library Foundation, which includes members of the Kennedy family and other prominent Americans. It is generally awarded each year around the time of JFK's birthday (May 29) at a ceremony at the Kennedy Library in Boston. The award is generally presented by JFK's daughter, Caroline. Also before their deaths, other presenters had included John Kennedy's brother, Ted, his son John Jr., and his wife Jacqueline.

Two recipients, John Lewis (in 2001) and William Winter (in 2008), were designated as honorees for Lifetime Achievement.

The winner is presented with a sterling silver lantern made by Tiffany's which was designed by Edwin Schlossberg. The lantern is patterned after the lanterns on the USS Constitution which was launched in 1797. It is the last sail-powered ship to remain part of the US Navy, and is permanently moored nearby.

Recipients

References

External links 
 , with list of recipients

American awards
Humanitarian and service awards
Awards established in 1989
Courage awards
John F. Kennedy